Stefan Goldmann (born 1978) is a German-Bulgarian DJ and composer of electronic music. His work has been described as intelligent minimal techno.

Career
Since 2001 Goldmann's music has been released through labels such as Perlon, Innervisions and others.  Since 2006 Goldmann has also been closely associated with Berlin's Berghain / Panorama Bar club, for which he writes a column, is a co-author of its book and conceived the Elektroakustischer Salon event series.

In 2010 he collaborated with choreographer Kevin O'day on a ballet commissioned by Nationaltheater Mannheim. Since then he has realized several commissioned and site-specific works outside the club circuit, including performances at Honen-in Temple in Kyoto, Japan (also released as a recording), the Los Angeles County Museum of Art and Zollverein in Essen. In 2016 he premiered the large format music theater work Alif at Berlin's MaerzMusik festival and wrote the soundtrack to Swiss experimental documentary film A1 in the same year. In 2020 he was invited to curate the Philharmonie Berlin's first electronic music program, Strom Festival, where he also performed in the Grand Hall.

Goldmann has written essays on digitization and the aesthetics of electronic music and has written a book on sound presets. He has held lectures and workshops on invitation of DAAD, the Berlin University of the Arts and other institutions. In 2012 he was artist in residence at Goethe Institut's Villa Kamogawa in Kyoto, Japan, and in 2017 at Villa Aurora in Los Angeles.

Macro Recordings
Based in Berlin, Germany, Macro was founded by Goldmann in 2007 and Finn Johannsen. Its releases range from techno tracks to symphonic recordings and include multiple live bands such as Elektro Guzzi and KUF in addition to releases by artists such as KiNK, Maria Chavez, Peter Kruder, Pete Namlook, Raudive, Santiago Salazar and remixes by Pépé Bradock, Ricardo Villalobos and The Knife's Oni Ayhun. The label has also released archival recordings such as the previously unreleased Patrick Cowley album Catholic. Several of its releases have been nominated for the Preis der Deutschen Schallplattenkritik, including works by Stefan Goldmann and Maria Chavez, and have entered annual polls of media such as Resident Advisor, De:Bug  and Groove Magazin (Germany).

Personal life
Goldmann is the son of German composer and conductor Friedrich Goldmann.

Discography (selected)

Albums 
 The Transitory State (Macro 2008, double CD)
 Voices Of The Dead (Macro 2008, 5x7" box set)
 Igor Stravinsky: Le Sacre Du Printemps Edit (Macro 2009, CD)
 Haven't I Seen You Before (Tapeworm 2010, Cassette)
 17:50 (Macro 2012, 2x12" and CD)
 Live At Honen-In Temple (Macro 2013, CD)
 Industry (Macro 2014, LP and CD)
 A1 (Macro 2016, CD)
 Tacit Script (Macro 2019, CD)
 Veiki (Macro 2019, CD)
 Live at Philharmonie Berlin (Macro 2020, CD)
 Vector Rituals (Macro 2022, LP)

Mix CDs 
 The Empty Foxhole (Mule Electronic 2009, mix CD)
 Macrospective (Macro 2011, mix CD)

DVDs 
 Parameter (Macro 2012, DVD)

Singles & EPs 
 The Shnic Shnac EP (Classic 2002, 12")
 Macroply/Submerge (Classic 2003, 12")
 Pain (Classic 2004, 12")
 Shimmer EP (Ovum 2004, 12")
 Blood (Perlon 2005, 12")
 Sleepy Hollow (Innervisions 2006, 12")
 Aurora / Beluga (Macro 2007, 12")
 Lunatic Fringe (Macro 2007, 12")
 Radiant Grace (Macro 2008, 12")
 Art Of Sorrow (Victoriaville 2009, 12")
 Yes To All / Under The Beam (Cocoon 2009, 12")
 The Maze (Macro 2010, 12")
 Remasters Vol.1 (Victoriaville 2010, 12")
 The Grand Hemiola (Macro 2011, 2x12")
 Emptying The Vaults 1 – 3 (Victoriaville 2011, 3x12")
 Adem EP, (Macro 2012, 12")
 Ghost Hemiola (Macro 2013, 2x12")
 Signs Taken For Wonders (Macro 2014, 12")
 Anchors EP (Macro 2015, 12")
 A1 Tools (Macro 2016, 12")
 An Ardent Heart (Macro 2018, 12")
 Tears Of Joy (Macro 2020, 12")
 Singing Wire (Macro 2022, 3x7")

Remixes 
Remixes include works for Christian Fennesz, Igor Stravinsky, Santiago Salazar, Kenny Hawkes, Freaks, DENA, Marc Romboy, Sergey Rodionov, Tuomi and others.

References

External links 
 
 Stefan Goldmann at facebook.com
 Stefan Goldmann discography on discogs.com
 Berghain flyer magazine archive (downloadable), containing Stefan Goldmann's Berghain columns

German DJs
1978 births
Living people
Electronic dance music DJs
German people of Bulgarian descent